Orés is a municipality in the Cinco Villas, in the province of Zaragoza, in the autonomous community of Aragon, Spain. It belongs to the comarca of Cinco Villas. It is placed 104 km to the northwest of the provincial capital city, Zaragoza. Its coordinates are: 42° 17' N, 1° 00' W, and is located at 647 m over sea level. Nowadays Orés has only 101 inhabitants, although it attained a population of almost 1000 inhabitants during the 19th century.

References

External links

Cultural Association "La Charata"

Municipalities in the Province of Zaragoza